St Andrew's Church is in Blackpool Road, Ashton-on-Ribble, Preston, Lancashire, England. It is an active Anglican parish church in the deanery of Preston, the archdeaconry of Lancaster, and the diocese of Blackburn. The church is recorded in the National Heritage List for England as a designated Grade II listed building.

History
The foundation stone of the church was laid on 20 August 1835, and the church was built in the 1836 consecrated on 7 October 1836 by the Rt Revd John Bird Sumner, bishop of Chester. At this time the church seated about 300 people. In 1873–74 the architect Ewan Christian added a north aisle and converted the nave windows into Early English style. A vestry was added in 1902.

Present day
St Andrew's Church is within the Conservative Evangelical tradition of the Church of England.

Architecture

Exterior
The church is constructed in sandstone with slate roofs. Its plan consists of a four-bay nave, a wide north aisle, a north porch, a chancel with an organ chamber to the north, a vestry to the east, and a small west tower. The tower is in Romanesque style, and the rest of the church is in Early English style. The tower is in three stages, with buttresses, and a short broach spire. In the bottom stage are two round-headed lancet windows, with a similar but larger window in the middle stage. The bell openings are louvred, and consist of triple round-headed lancets. Along the sides of the nave and the aisle are three two-light windows, and a three-light window in the eastern bay.

Interior
Inside the church, the arcade is carried on cylindrical piers of polished pink granite. In the chancel is a sedilia. On the wall of the church are monuments to members of the Pedder family. The stained glass in the east window is by Hardman. The three-manual organ was built in 1902 by Henry Willis & Sons. It was overhauled in 1969 by J. W. Walker, and again in 2001 by Wood of Huddersfield.

External features
The churchyard contains the war graves of a Royal Air Force officer of World War I, and an Army Dental Corps officer and Royal Army Medical Corps sergeant of World War II.

Further reading
Douglas B Cochrane, A History of the Parish of St Andrew's Ashton-on-Ribble, ASAA

See also

Listed buildings in Preston, Lancashire

References

Church of England church buildings in Lancashire
Grade II listed churches in Lancashire
Romanesque Revival church buildings in England
Gothic Revival church buildings in England
Gothic Revival architecture in Lancashire
Diocese of Blackburn
Churches in Preston
Conservative evangelical Anglican churches in England